The Journal of Marriage and Family is a peer-reviewed academic journal published by Wiley-Blackwell on behalf of the National Council on Family Relations. It was established in 1939 as Living, renamed to Marriage and Family Living in 1941, and obtained its current title in 1964. The current editor-in-chief is Kristi Williams (Ohio State University). The journal covers research and theory, research interpretation and reviews, and critical discussion on all aspects of marriage, close relationships, and families.

Journal of Marriage and Family is indexed by Thomson Reuters. According to the Journal Citation Reports, the journal has a 2017 2-year impact factor of 2.802.    Google Scholar ranks it first among journals in Family Studies and 6th among sociology journals.

References

External links 
 
 National Council on Family Relations

Sociology journals
Wiley-Blackwell academic journals
English-language journals
Publications established in 1939
5 times per year journals